Richard Wallop may refer to:

 Richard Wallop (judge) (1616–1697), English judge
Richard Wallop (MP) (died c. 1435), English politician